John Winston (24 October 1927 – 19 September 2019) was an English actor. He was known for his supporting appearances in the original 1960s Star Trek series as "Lieutenant Kyle", who served variously as transporter operator or bridge officer, which he reprised – promoted to the rank of commander – for a minor role in the 1982 motion picture Star Trek II: The Wrath of Khan.

Filmography 
 The Man from U.N.C.L.E. (1966, TV Series) - U.N.C.L.E. Agent
 Twelve O'Clock High (1966, TV Series) - British Co-Pilot
 The Time Tunnel (1966, TV Series) - British Sentry (uncredited) / The Guard
 Star Trek (1966–69, TV Series) - Lt. Kyle / Transporter Chief / Transporter Technician
 Sole Survivor (1970, TV Movie) - British Pilot
 Assault on the Wayne (1971, TV Movie) - English Scientist
 California Split (1974) - Tenor
 Charlie's Angels (1978, TV Series) - Hotel Clerk
 Star Trek II: The Wrath of Khan (1982) - Commander Kyle
 The Fall Guy (1982, TV Series) - Manager
 Max Headroom (1987, TV Series) - Plantaganet
 Lucky/Chances ... (1990, TV Series) - Smythson
 Star Trek: New Voyages (2004, online TV Series) - Captain Matthew Jefferies

References

External links 
 

1927 births
2019 deaths
20th-century English male actors
21st-century English male actors
British expatriate male actors in the United States
English expatriates in the United States
English male film actors
English male television actors
Male actors from Leeds